@Home or @home may refer to:

 HotSpot @Home, now defunct American home telecom service
 @Home Network, now defunct cable broadband provider
 @home, chain of Indian retail stores
 Suffix for volunteer distributed computing projects generally using BOINC

See also
 At Home (disambiguation)